The church of Santi Gregorio e Siro is a Renaissance-style Roman Catholic parish church on Via Montegrappa 15 in central Bologna, Italy. Initially this was the Church of San Gregorio, but when the nearby parish church of San Siro had been torn down, and the names were fused.

History
It was founded on grounds that had been expropriated by the Ghislieri family from the Bentivoglio. It was constructed by the canons of San Giorgio in Alga, an island in the lagoon of Venice; the architects were Tibaldo Tibaldi (Tibaldo Cristoforo di Tibaldi) and Giovanni Antonio, both from Milan.

In 1676, it passed to the order of Clerics Regular ministering to the sick (Chierici Regolari Ministri degli Infermi). The earthquake of 1780 damaged the church, and it was rebuilt by the architect  Angelo Venturoli. Over the entry is the heraldic shield of the Ghisilieri family, and the bell-tower was adapted from a medieval tower from a family palace.

Interior
The simple exterior does not reflect the highly decorated interior, which has ceiling frescoes by Luigi Samoggia and Alessandro Guardassoni (1868), a main altarpiece is a St Gregory shows the bleeding Eucharist to the Heretic by Denys Calvaert (1581) and  works by Camillo Procaccini. Among the decorations is an Eternal Father by  Ludovico Carracci. The altar decoration is in marble called Formaginni di Sanremo.

Other works listed inside the church by Bianconi include:
St Sebastian wounded with St Fabiano decapitated by Giovanni Luigi Valesio
St John of Nepomuk by Paris Porroni
Assunta attributed to Procaccini
St Emidio (Emygdius) Ovals by Giovanni Andrea Claudio Portoni
St Camillus de Lellis by Felice Torelli
Virgin with St Andrew, Lorenzo Giustiniani and Anthony Abbot by Lucio Massari
Jesus baptized in Glory by God the Father attributed to a young Annibale Carracci
Transit of St Joseph by Carlo Antonio Rambaldi
St George and the Dragon with Archangel Michael and the Devil by Ludovico Carracci
St Lawrence and the sacred heart of Jesus by Jacopo Alessandro Calvi

References

Mapa Arte Italia, guide to church.

16th-century Roman Catholic church buildings in Italy
Roman Catholic churches in Bologna
Renaissance architecture in Bologna